Horama margarita is a moth of the subfamily Arctiinae. It was described by Timothy L. McCabe in 1992. It is found in Cuba.

References

Euchromiina
Moths described in 1992
Endemic fauna of Cuba